The 184th Ordnance Battalion (EOD) of the United States Army accomplishes the explosive ordnance disposal (EOD) support activity. The EOD battalion operates under United States Army Forces Command (52nd Ordnance Group (EOD)) command and control with several companies (EOD) strategically located within each control area. Installations and MACOMs do not have a direct area support EOD responsibility.

Organization
Six Ordnance Units (5 Ordnance Companies and 1 Ordnance Battalion) EOD (Explosive Ordnance Disposal).

Fort Campbell, Kentucky
-49th Ordnance Company EOD (Explosive Ordnance Disposal)
-717th Ordnance Company EOD (Explosive Ordnance Disposal)
-723rd Ordnance Company EOD (Explosive Ordnance Disposal)
-744th Ordnance Company EOD (Explosive Ordnance Disposal)
-Headquarters and Headquarters Detachment (HHD), 184th Ordnance Battalion EOD (Explosive Ordnance Disposal)

Fort Benning, Georgia
-789th Ordnance Company EOD (Explosive Ordnance Disposal)

Lineage
 Constituted 18 October 1927 in the Regular Army as the 6th Motor Repair Battalion
 Redesignated 1 May 1936 as the 53d Quartermaster Regiment (less 1st Battalion)
 Activated on 10 February 1941 as Headquarters and Headquarters Detachment, 3d Battalion, 53d Quartermaster Regiment at Fort Bragg, North Carolina
 Converted and redesignated 18 August 1942 as Headquarters and Headquarters Detachment, 3d Battalion, 53d Ordnance Heavy Maintenance Regiment
 Reorganized and redesignated 7 October 1942 as Headquarters and Headquarters Detachment, 184th Ordnance Heavy Maintenance Battalion
 Redesignated 31 May 1943 as Headquarters and Headquarters Detachment, 184th Ordnance Battalion
 Inactivated 11 March 1946 in Germany
 Activated 1 June 1954 at Fort Sill, Oklahoma
 Reorganized and redesignated 12 August 1965 as Headquarters and Headquarters Company, 184th Ordnance Battalion
 Inactivated 2 April 1972 at Fort Lewis, Washington
 Activated 16 June 1998 at Fort Gillem, Georgia as Headquarters and Headquarters Detachment, 184th Ordnance Battalion (EOD)
 Moved to Fort Campbell, Kentucky in late 2008 to early 2009 as Headquarters and Headquarters Detachment, 184th Ordnance Battalion (EOD)

Honors

Campaign participation credit
World War II
Normandy
Northern France
Rhineland
Ardennes-Alsace
Central Europe

Vietnam
Counteroffensive
Counteroffensive, Phase II
Counteroffensive, Phase III
Tet Counteroffensive
Counteroffensive, Phase IV
Counteroffensive, Phase V
Counteroffensive, Phase VI
Tet 69/Counteroffensive
Summer-Fall 1969
Winter-Spring 1970
Sanctuary Counteroffensive
Counteroffensive, Phase VII
Consolidation I
Consolidation II
Cease-Fire

Decorations
 Meritorious Unit Commendation (Army) for VIETNAM 1967–1968
 Meritorious Unit Commendation (Army) for VIETNAM 1968–1969

External links
 184TH Ordnance Battalion (EOD) Lineage and Honors at the United States Army Center of Military History

053
Military units and formations established in 1998